Carl Nielsen's Pan and Syrinx (Pan og Syrinx) is a symphonic poem written for a concert of the composer's works which was held on 11 February 1918 in Copenhagen.

Background

As late as 23 January 1918, in a letter to Swedish composer Wilhelm Stenhammar, Nielsen explained that although he had included Pan and Syrinx in his concert on 11 February, he had not yet written a single note. It appears, however, that he had been thinking about the piece for some time, ever since he and his wife Anne Marie had discussed Ovid's Metamorphoses the previous year, inspiring him to compose the music. He did however manage to complete the score by 6 February.

In addition to Pan and Syrinx, the concert which was devoted to works by Nielsen over almost 20 years, included the prelude to Act Two of Saul and David, Sleep and the Fourth Symphony, all conducted by Nielsen himself, as well as Chaconne for Piano played by Christian Christiansen.

Reception

Pan and Syrinx was particularly well received. Writing in Politken, Charles Kjerulf first alluded to its "Gallic, quite Debussyesque" quality before praising its feeling of renewal, development and mastery. He ended even more gushingly: "For each note that was added it became more and more sublime. And when in the end the very highest and very lowest notes of the orchestra were sounded right up against each other in the violin harmonics and double-basses... then the rejoicing broke out quite spontaneously." The other reviews were also positive.

The work was frequently played in Scandinavia during Nielsen's lifetime. When the composer
planned a concert programme, he often chose to perform Saga Dream and Pan and Syrinx on the same occasion.

Music

The nine-minute symphonic poem is based on the ancient legend which tells how the amorous god Pan invented the pan flute when following the nymph Syrinx. Syrinx ran to the river's edge and asked for assistance from the river nymphs.  In answer, she was transformed into hollow water reeds that made a haunting sound when the god's frustrated breath blew across them. Pan cut the reeds to fashion the first set of pan pipes, which were thenceforth known as syrinx.

As the piece features Syrinx it obviously has major parts for woodwind solos. The music was written at the height of Nielsen's powers as a composer, shortly after he finished the Fourth Symphony. It is a vigorous, pretty, and poetic work.

References

Compositions by Carl Nielsen
1918 compositions
Symphonic poems
Music based on Metamorphoses